Several of the Roman legions have become known as "lost legions":

 Legio XVII, XVIII and XIX, defeated in the Battle of the Teutoburg Forest in 9 AD
 Legio IX Hispana, disappeared from surviving reports in Britannia 108 AD and Germania Inferior around 130 AD